László Magdics (27 December 1902 – 30 July 1972) was a Hungarian sprinter. He competed in the men's 400 metres at the 1928 Summer Olympics.

References

1902 births
1972 deaths
Athletes (track and field) at the 1928 Summer Olympics
Hungarian male sprinters
Olympic athletes of Hungary
Place of birth missing